Keith Urbahn is the president and a founding partner of Javelin, a literary and creative agency located in Alexandria, Virginia that offers representation and public relations services.

Education
Urbahn studied religion and Arabic as an undergraduate at Yale University. He graduated summa cum laude in 2006.

Professional career
Urbahn worked for former Secretary of Defense Donald Rumsfeld as a speechwriter at the Pentagon, and served as Rumsfeld's chief of staff from 2009 to 2012. He helped oversee the publication of Rumsfeld's number one New York Times bestselling 2011 memoir, Known and Unknown. He previously worked in the U.S. Senate for Republican Majority Leader Mitch McConnell. Urbahn also serves as a commissioned reserve intelligence officer in the U.S. Navy. Urbahn is credited as the person who first broke the news of Osama bin Laden's death. On May 1, 2011, he tweeted, "So I'm told by a reputable person they have killed Osama Bin Laden. Hot damn."

Javelin
With his business partner Matt Latimer, Urbahn founded Javelin in 2011. Among the projects Urbahn has overseen at Javelin is the development and launch of Churchill Solitaire, a viral mobile app of a version of solitaire once played by Winston Churchill. In addition, he has represented authors and media personalities on book and television deals, such as Donna Brazile, James Comey, and Tucker Carlson.

Personal
Urbahn lives in Alexandria, Virginia and has two children, Benjamin and William. Urbahn is the son of Jennifer K. Urbahn and Maximilian O. Urbahn III. His grandfather, Max O. Urbahn, was a prolific architect of government buildings whose work included the design of one of the world's largest structures, the Vehicle Assembly Building at Cape Canaveral, Florida.

References

Living people
Yale University alumni
George W. Bush administration personnel
American speechwriters
United States Navy officers
Year of birth missing (living people)